Poloniny National Park is a national park in northeastern Slovakia at the Polish and Ukrainian borders, in the Bukovské vrchy mountain range, which belongs to the Eastern Carpathians. Selected areas of the park are included into Primeval Beech Forests of the Carpathians UNESCO World Heritage Site.

Location
The park is located in the Snina District in the Prešov Region. It is adjacent to Bieszczady National Park in Poland, together they are part of the East Carpathian Biosphere Reserve. The highest point lies at  AMSL on a point where the borders of Slovakia, Poland and Ukraine meet, near the summit of the mount Kremenec. The National Park is the easternmost and least populated area of the country. Hiking trails starts from several villages, most notably Nová Sedlica but also from Runina, Topoľa and Uličské Krivé.

Biology and ecology
Forests cover about 80% of the area; beech and beech-fir forests are dominant. The National Park has the highest concentration of old growth forests in Slovakia, which are protected by national nature reserves. Meadows, called poloniny in Eastern Slovak dialects, situated on the main ridge of the Bukovské vrchy mountain range are common.

Many species found in the park are endemic and rare. Altogether, 800 fungi and 100 lichens are native to Poloniny. Poloniny National Park contains about 5,981 known species of invertebrates (for example, 91 molluscs, 1,472 true bugs, 819 butterflies, and 403 spiders) and 294 vertebrates. Among the vertebrates are 13 species of amphibians, 8 reptiles, 198 birds, 55 mammals, including the Eurasian lynx, bear, and others. About 1,000 species of vascular plants have been found in the park. Many of them are endangered and protected. A small herd of wisent (Bison Bonasus) was reintroduced in the area in 2004.

Tourism

The National Park is open to the public all year with winter (cross-country skiing) as well as summer hiking trails. Besides several mountain trails there is also one connecting outstanding wooden churches from the 18th century in Topoľa, Uličské Krivé, and Ruský Potok.

World Heritage Site

The primeval beech forests of Havešová, Stužica, and Rožok (all three areas being in the Bukovské vrchy) were designated as a World Heritage Site by the UNESCO on June 28, 2007 because of their comprehensive and undisturbed ecological patterns and processes. Together with another Slovak site in Vihorlat and additional six in Ukraine they form Primeval Beech Forests of the Carpathians. In order to protect the extraordinary value of these forests, only one of them, namely Stužica, is accessible to the public.

See also 
 Protected areas of Slovakia
 Carpathian Wooden Churches
 Stužica

Gallery

References

External links 
 Poloniny National Park at Slovakia.travel 
 Poloniny National Park at Snina Region homepage
 Official website at the State Nature Conservancy of the Slovak Republic website 
 Wooden Churches in Slovakia
 National Park Poloniny, cross country skiing.

National parks of Slovakia
World Heritage Sites in Slovakia
Protected areas established in 1997
Protected areas of the Eastern Carpathians
Geography of Prešov Region
Tourist attractions in Prešov Region
Primeval Beech Forests in Europe